Ramat David (lit. David Heights) is a kibbutz in northern Israel. Located in the Jezreel Valley near Ramat David Airbase, it falls under the jurisdiction of Jezreel Valley Regional Council.

History
The kibbutz was established in 1926, and was named after David Lloyd George, who was Prime Minister of the United Kingdom when the Balfour Declaration was made. The German-Jewish architect Richard Kauffmann drew up plans for the design of Ramat David in 1931.

The British author Roald Dahl landed his RAF Hurricane at the British Mandate airstrip at Ramat David early in 1941. He describes the German Jewish refugee children living there at that time in his autobiography Going Solo.

On 22 May 1948 Egyptian planes attacked the airbase, damaging and destroying a number of British Royal Air Force planes.

Notable people

 Ze'ev Herring (1910–1988), politician who served as a member of the Knesset for the Alignment between 1969 and 1974
 Ruth Westheimer (born Karola Siegel, 1928; known as "Dr. Ruth") German-American sex therapist, talk show host, author, professor, Holocaust survivor, and former Haganah sniper
 Zvi Yanai (1935–2013), civil servant and author

Gallery

References

Kibbutzim
Kibbutz Movement
Populated places established in 1926
Populated places in Northern District (Israel)
1926 establishments in Mandatory Palestine